Raja Club Athletic (Arabic: نادي الرجاء الرياضي, romanized: Nādī ar–Rajāʾ ar–Riyāḍī) is a professional sports club based in Casablanca, Morocco. They played their first ever international match in 17 September 1950 in the North African Cup and won by walkover. The club played in a CAF-organized competition for the first time in 1983 and took part in the now-defunct African Cup Winners' Cup as Throne Cup winners and lost 1–0 on aggregate to Senegalese side ASF Police. It was their only participation in this competition. Raja CA is the Moroccan club with the most African appearances.

Raja CA has had the most success in the African Cup, winning the trophy for three times. Raja won the inaugural season under the revamped CAF Champions League title and format in 1997. The club has also won the last edition of the CAF Cup in 2003 before it was merged with the African Cup Winners' Cup, the Confederation Cup in 2018 and 2021, the Super Cup in 2000 and 2019, the Afro-Asian Cup in 1998, the Arab Club Champions Cup in 2006 and 2021 and the UNAF Club Cup in 2015. Raja has also participated in two FIFA Club World Cups with their best performance being the second place in 2013. Raja CA, with 12 trophies, is the most successful team in Morocco and the third in Africa in international club football.

In the tables (N) symbolises neutral ground, (a) away goals and (P) penalty shoot-out. The first score is always Raja CA's.

CAF Competitions

C1, C2 & C3

CAF Super Cup

FIFA competitions

FIFA Club World Cup

Afro–Asian Club Championship

UAFA & UNAF competitions

Finals

Details

Statistics

By season 

Pld = Played
W = Games won
D = Games drawn
L = Games lost
F = Goals for
A = Goals against
GS = Group stage

PR = Preliminary round
R1 = First round
R2 = Second round
PO = Play-off round
R16 = Round of 16
QF = Quarter-final
SF = Semi-final

Key to colours and symbols:

By competition

CAF Competitions

Non–CAF competitions

African goals

Top goalscorers 
Bold indicates player is still active at club level.

Super Hat–tricks

Hat–tricks

Braces

Notes

References

External links 

International
Raja CA